The Evil Next Door is a 2020 Swedish mystery horror drama film written and directed by Oskar Mellander and Tord Danielsson in their feature film debut. The film premiered in Sweden on 23 October 2020.

Plot
When Shirin moves into a new house with her new boyfriend Fredrik and his five-year-old son Lucas, it seems like a good idea to live together as a family. Lucas is still struggling with the recent death of his mother, and so Shirin is not surprised by his question about whether dead people can actually come back. However, when he talks about his new friend next door, she becomes suspicious, because the other half of the house has been empty for years! Little by little, she discovers that the house holds a terrible secret and that something evil is after Lucas...

Cast
Jakob Fahlstedt as Polis
Janna Granström as Julia
Dilan Gwyn as Shirin
Karin Holmberg as Katja
Troy James as Monster
Eddie Eriksson Dominguez
Henrik Norlén as Peter Lindvall
Linus Wahlgren as Fredrik
Niklas Jarneheim as Mäklare
Sovi Rydén

Release
The film premiered in Sweden on 23 October 2020. It had a limited theatrical release in North America and made its streaming debut on 25 June 2021. It was internationally released on 8 January 2021 by Magnet Releasing.

Reception

Box office
The Evil Next Door grossed $1,010 in the United States and Canada, and a worldwide total of $1.4 million.

Critical response

Jeanette White of Comic Book Resources wrote "While The Evil Next Doors Bogeyman lacks a proper origin story, its supernatural abilities and desire to consume children remain pretty standard horror genre fare". Joanna K. Neilson of Horror DNA gave the film 4 out of 5 stars and wrote "Personally, I'd love to survive yet another terrifying night with The Evil Next Door.

References

External links

2020 drama films
2020 horror films
Swedish horror films
Swedish mystery drama films
2020s Swedish-language films
2020 directorial debut films